The Atlantic Lacrosse Conference (ALC) is a lacrosse conference in the United States that participates in the Men's Collegiate Lacrosse Association (MCLA). The ALC operates in the U.S. states of Pennsylvania, West Virginia, Virginia, Tennessee, North Carolina and South Carolina and is split into two divisions, Division I and Division II. The conference is governed by an executive board and the team that wins the conference's divisional playoffs receive an automatic bid to the MCLA National Championship.

History 
At the end of the 2020 season, the MCLA Board of Directors announced that they voted to split the SouthEastern Lacrosse Conference (SELC), resulting in the founding of a new conference, which would become the Atlantic Lacrosse Conference. Its founding members were Clemson, East Carolina, George Washington, Liberty, North Carolina State, Tennessee, Virginia Tech and West Virginia.

At the end of the 2021 season, the ALC announced its intentions to expand and create a division 2 component to the conference. The founding division 2 teams were Appalachian State, Coastal Carolina, Elon, UNC-Charlotte, UNC-Wilmington and Wake Forest, all of which moved over from the SELC. It was also announced at that time that Pittsburgh and Temple had moved from the Continental Lacrosse Conference (CLC) to the ALC, joining its Division 1 teams.

The 2023 season added three new division 2 teams, College of Charleston, The Citadel, and Davidson College, all whom moved over from the SELC.

Teams

Conference Champions

References 

College lacrosse leagues in the United States
Sports organizations established in 2020
2020 establishments in the United States